Ambasamudram is the principal town of the Ambasamudram taluk in Tirunelveli district in the state of Tamil Nadu, India. The entire taluk had a population of 392,226 as of 2001, with 42.5% classified as rural. The town of Ambasamudram had a population 35,645 as of 2011.

The Thirumulanathar temple is located in Ambasamudram, on Melapalayam street. Kasibanathaswami Temple is another ancient temple of Ambasamudram which has a history of more than 200 years.

Geography

This town is situated in the foothills of western ghats on the northern bank of Tamirabarani (Tamiram = copper, it contains traces of copper) river with a twin town Kallidaikurichi/Kallidai is situated on the southern bank.

Climate

Demographics

According to 2011 census, Ambasamudram had a population of 35,645 with a sex-ratio of 1,048 females for every 1,000 males, much above the national average of 929. A total of 3,293 were under the age of six, constituting 1,658 males and 1,635 females. Scheduled Castes and Scheduled Tribes accounted for 15.98% and 0.24% of the population respectively. The average literacy of the town was 78.91%, compared to the national average of 72.99%. The town had a total of : 9845 households. There were a total of 16,163 workers, comprising 376 cultivators, 1,863 main agricultural labourers, 2,367 in house hold industries, 9,818 other workers, 1,739 marginal workers, 16 marginal cultivators, 198 marginal agricultural labourers, 353 marginal workers in household industries and 1,172 other marginal workers.

As per the religious census of 2011, Ambasamudram had 89.56% Hindus, 6.% Muslims, 4.3% Christians, 0.01% Sikhs, 0.03% Buddhists, 0.09% following other religions and 0.02% following no religion or did not indicate any religious preference.

Places of interest

Maancholai Hills is located between elevations ranging from 1,000 to 1,500 metres. The Maancholai area is deep within the Western Ghats, within the Kalakad Mundanthurai Tiger Reserve in the Tirunelveli District. Located on top of the Manimuthar Dam and the Manimuthar Water Falls, the Maancholai area comprises tea plantations, small settlements around the plantations; Upper Kodaiyar Dam and a windy view point called Kuthiravetti. Manimuttar Dam, Gadananathi River Dam, Rice Research Station of TNAU,  Papanasam Dam, Karaiyar Dam, Singampatti Zamin palace, Servalar Dam, Kalakkad Mundanthurai Tiger Reserve, Agasthiyar Falls fed by lower dam., Baana Theertham Falls, Tamirabarani river, Sri Vedhanarayanar Rajagopalaswami Kulasekhara Azhwar Temple, Papanasaswamy Temple, Agashtiyar Temple, Krishnaswamy temple, kasi viswanathar temple and Durgai Amman Temple are the popular visitor attractions around the town.Also Papanasm , Agasthiyar falls which is around 5 Km from Ambasamudram.

Politics
Ambasamudram (State Assembly Constituency) is part of Tirunelveli (Lok Sabha constituency).

See also
 Mannarkovil, an ancient temple town
 Brahmadesam, an ancient temple town
 Thiruppudaimarudur, an ancient temple town
 Veeravanallur, an ancient temple town
 Kallidaikurichi, Ambasamudram's twin town
 Papanasam, which has good falls and temple
 Kutralam, best tourist spot of south india

References

Cities and towns in Tirunelveli district